Illusion is the second studio album by the English progressive rock band Renaissance, released in 1971. It was originally released only in Germany and did not receive a wider release until 1973. It was first released in the UK in 1977, with a cover that had the original front and rear cover artwork swapped.

Overview
Following an American tour to support their first album, the band returned to the studio in the spring of 1970 to begin work on their second. The band recorded "Love Goes On", "Golden Thread", "Love Is All", and "Face of Yesterday" before they began to fall apart. Keith Relf and Jim McCarty were the first to leave, deciding to cease as performing members but remain involved with production and composition for the band. John Hawken recruited singer Terry Crowe and guitarist Michael Dunford (both from Hawken's previous band The Nashville Teens), as well as session drummer Terry Slade to replace Relf and McCarty. Louis Cennamo left shortly afterwards to join Colosseum. Bassist Neil Korner, another former member of The Nashville Teens, replaced him.

This new 6-person line-up, recorded a Dunford composition, "Mr. Pine". However, due to a lack of material for the album, the (already disbanded) original line-up got back together, minus Hawken and plus guest keyboardist Don Shinn, to record "Past Orbits of Dust". Shortly after recording was complete, the only two remaining original members - Jane Relf and John Hawken - left the band, to be replaced by Anne-Marie "Binky" Cullom and John Tout, respectively.

"Mr. Pine" is the only track on a Renaissance album where members of the original line-up (Hawken, Jane Relf) are heard together with a member of the classic line-up (Dunford). It includes a theme that was later used in the far better-known Renaissance song "Running Hard" (from Turn of the Cards, 1974).

One track recorded during the Illusion sessions, a fairly short song called "Statues", was not used on the album. It was eventually released in 2002 on the album Live + Direct. The original album was re-issued on CD in 1995 by Repertoire Records.

Illusion was the first Renaissance album to feature lyrics by Betty Thatcher, who would work with the band throughout its entire "classic" period (1972–79) and beyond. Thatcher was brought to the band by her friend Jane Relf.

When the four surviving members of the original Renaissance reunited in 1976, after the death of Keith Relf, the Renaissance name was already being retained in use by their successors in the band. Henceforth they named their new reunion band as "Illusion", alluding to the album they had recorded as the previous group. Their first album under this bandname, entitled Out of the Mist, included a reworking of the song "Face of Yesterday"; while their second album was eponymously titled  Illusion.

Track listing

Personnel

Renaissance
Jane Relf – lead vocals (1, 5 & 6), backing vocals, percussion
John Hawken – keyboards [not present on 6]
Keith Relf – guitars, lead vocals (3), backing vocals [not present on (4)]
Louis Cennamo – bass [not present on (4)]
Jim McCarty – drums, percussion, lead vocals (2), backing vocals [not present on (4)]
Terry Crowe – lead vocals (4)
Michael Dunford – guitars (4)
Neil Korner – bass (4)
Terry Slade – drums, percussion (4)

Additional musician
Don Shinn – keyboards (6)

Production
Keith Relf – producer
Andy Johns, Phil Ault – engineers

Notes

References

External links

Renaissance (band) albums
1971 albums
Island Records albums
Repertoire Records albums